Dover is an unincorporated community in Screven County, Georgia, United States. Dover has a post office with ZIP code 30424.

History
A post office called Dover has been in operation since 1886. According to tradition, the community was named after a place mentioned in a Baptist publication.

References

Unincorporated communities in Screven County, Georgia
Unincorporated communities in Georgia (U.S. state)